Axiagasta may refer to:

 Axiagasta (fungus moth) , a monotypic genus of fungus moth in family Tineidae
 Axiagasta (geometer moth) , a genus of geometer moth in subfamily Oenochrominae